Nasirabad is a town located in the Hunza District of Gilgit-Baltistan, Pakistan.

Geography 
Nasirabad is located in Gilgit-Baltistan and bordered to the south by the Hunza River. The Karakoram Highway is the main commercial road, containing multiple businesses including hotels, hostels, cafes, and stores.

Former names 
Nasirabad was known as Hayul Dass during the Rono age. It was later known as Manishmal, a Hindi word for "a fertile place with great prosperity". Later still it was known as "Hini", derived from "Hin", which means "snow" in the Shina language.

History 
The earliest known history of Nasirabad dates back to the Rono people, who flourished across the Hunza region. The Rono emerged and flourished before the early-16th-century arrival of the forefathers of the current tribes in the settlement, such as the Tartay and Doodiye.

Gallery

References 

Hunza